The Muslim conquest of Transoxiana or Arab conquest of Transoxiana were the 7th and 8th century conquests, by Umayyad and Abbasid Arabs, of Transoxiana, the land between the Oxus (Amu Darya) and Jaxartes (Syr Darya) rivers, a part of Central Asia that today includes all or parts of Uzbekistan, Tajikistan, Kazakhstan, and Kyrgyzstan.

Background 
The Arabs had reached Central Asia in the decade after their decisive victory in the Battle of Nihavend in 642, when they completed their conquest of the former Sasanian Empire by seizing Sistan and Khurasan. Marv, the capital of Khurasan, fell in 651 to Abdallah ibn Amir, and with it the borders of the nascent Caliphate reached the river Oxus (modern Amu Darya). The lands beyond the Oxus—Transoxiana or Transoxania, known simply as "the land beyond the river" (mā wara al-nahr) to the Arabs—were different to what the Arabs had encountered before: not only did they encompass a varied topography, ranging from the remote mountains of the Hindu Kush to fertile river valleys and deserts with oasis cities; they were also settled by a variety of peoples, both sedentary and nomadic, and instead of the imperial administration of the Persians, the region was divided into many small independent principalities.

Geographically, politically, and socially, Transoxiana was divided into four regions: Tokharistan on the upper Oxus, surrounded by the Hissar Mountains to the north and the Hindu Kush to the east and south; Sogdia or Sogdiana, to the east of the middle Oxus and around the Zarafshan river; Khwarezm or Chorasmia, on the lower Oxus and its confluence into the Aral Sea; and the lands north of the Hissar Mountains and along the Jaxartes river (modern Syr Darya), including Zhetysu and the Fergana Valley. As today, the population belonged to two broad linguistic groups: the speakers of Iranian languages, who in the 7th century tended to be urbanized, and the Turkic peoples, who at the time were still mostly nomadic. Indeed, the history of Transoxiana had been dominated by the invasions of nomadic peoples from Central Asia. In the 2nd century BC the Yuezhi destroyed the Greco-Bactrian Kingdom and supplanted it with the Kushan Empire, under which Buddhism entered the area. The Kushans were succeeded by the Hephthalites in the early 5th century, whose dominance lasted until the rise of the First Turkic Khaganate in the mid-6th century. After the great Khaganate became divided in two, the Western Turkic Khaganate retained its position of overlordship over the various principalities of Transoxiana, on occasion even launching raids as far as Balkh.

When the Chinese Buddhist monk Xuanzang visited Tokharistan in 630, he found no less than 27 different principalities, under the overall authority of a Turkish prince (Shad) at Qunduz, who was the eldest son of the Western Turkic Jabghu. Following the collapse of the Western Turkic Khaganate in the 650s, this viceroy became an independent ruler, claiming the title of Jabghu for himself. The Jabghus maintained some sort of suzerainty over the other principalities of Tokharistan, but this authority was largely nominal, and the local princes—many of whom were Turkish chieftains and local governors who had likewise seized authority in the wake of the Khaganate's collapse—were effectively independent. North of the Oxus, in Upper Tokharistan, the most important principalities from east to west were Badakhshan, Khuttal, Kubadhiyan, and Saghaniyan. South of the Oxus, in Lower Tokharistan, was Balkh, the ancient capital of the entire region, which remained the most important settlement of Tokharistan and its main religious centre, with the famous Buddhist stupa of Nawbahar attracting pilgrims from far and wide. Important principalities were those of Juzjan, Badghis, Herat, and Bamiyan. Behind these, over the Hindu Kish, lay Kabul.

North and west of the Hissar range, along the river Zarafshan, lay the region of Sogdia. This was an ancient Iranian land, with its own culture, language, and script, which are well documented through archaeological discoveries and literary references. Sogdia was likewise split into several small principalities, but the two major centres of Bukhara and Samarkand dominated the rest. The Sogdians were particularly active as merchants in the so-called "Silk Road". Chinese records seem to suggest that most of the local princes belonged to branches of the same ruling house, and that the head of this house, the ruler of Samarkand, was allied by marriage to the Turkic khagans. Most of these rulers used Persian titles (khudah, shah) but some also had Turkish titles, and the ruler of Samarkand, as the pre-eminent among them, used the Sogdian title of ikhshid (as did the kings of Fargana). Rulership was hereditary, but an important role was played also by the landed gentry (Dihqans) and wealthy merchants, who possessed, according to H. A. R. Gibb, "not only a large measure of independence but also on occasion the power to depose the ruling prince and elect his successor".

To the north and east of Sogdia stretched the so-called "Hungry Steppe", an expanse of ca. 160 km, which gave way to the fertile regions around the river Jaxartes. The Jaxartes was smaller than the Oxus and easily fordable. The region encompassed the principality of Shash (modern Tashkent) in the northwest, and the Fergana Valley to the east, bordering the Tien Shan Mountains, behind which lay Kashgar, the westernmost outpost of the Chinese Empire. To the west of Sogdia, likewise isolated amidst the desert, lay Khwarezm. It was inhabited by a sedentary, urbanized Iranian people. The history of the area between the late 3rd century and the onset of the Muslim conquest is often unclear due to the lack of adequate literary and archaeological sources. Modern scholars dispute whether the area came under Kushan rule, notably due to the absence of any traces of Buddhism in the area and the continued prevalence of Zoroastrianism; al-Tabari reports that the area was conquered by the Sasanians under Ardashir I (r. 224–242), and although later Sasanian province lists don't include Khwarezm, the area probably remained in some kind of dependence from Sasanian Persia. From the early 4th century, Khwarezm was ruled by the native Afrighid dynasty, which is known through coins and the narrative of the 11th-century Khwarezmian scholar al-Biruni. It is equally unclear whether Khwarezm came under Turkic dominion in the 6th–7th centuries.

Transoxiana, as Hugh N. Kennedy remarks, "was a rich land, full of opportunities and wealth but defended by warlike men who valued their independence very highly", and indeed its subjugation would prove to be the longest and hardest-fought of the early Muslim conquests, not being completed until the Battle of Talas secured Muslim dominance over the region in 751.

First Muslim incursions 

Although the Arab sources give the impression that the Arabs began their conquest of the region in the 650s, in reality most of the early warfare in the area were little more than raids aiming at seizing booty and extracting tribute. Indeed, Arab presence was limited to a small garrison at Marw, and armies were sent by the governors of Iraq every year to raid and plunder the native principalities. The first expedition, under Ahnaf ibn Qays, in 652, was repulsed by the united forces of Lower Tokharistan, and returned to Marw al-Rudh. A second expedition under al-Aqra ibn Habis however was able to defeat the prince of Juzjan, and occupy Juzjan, Faryab, Talaqan, and Balkh. Detachments of Arabs plundered far and wide, some reaching as far as Khwarazm. In 654, the town of Mayamurgh in Sogdia was raided. Shortly after, however, the local population, led by Qarin (possibly a member of the House of Karen) rose in revolt. The Arabs evacuated all of Khurasan, and according to Chinese sources, the princes of Tokharistan restored Yazdegerd III's son Peroz as titular king of Persia for a time. Preoccupied with the First Fitna (656–661), the Arabs were unable to react, although raiding expeditions continue to be recorded in 655–658.

After the end of the civil war, Abdallah ibn Amir was again entrusted with restoring Muslim control over Khurasan. The exact events of the next few years are unclear as the historical traditions confuse them with Ibn Amir's original conquest of the area, but what information there is, mostly from tribal accounts, suggests occasional fierce resistance and rebellions, leading to acts like the destruction of the Nawbahar stupa by Ibn Amir's deputy Qays ibn al-Hatham. It was not until the appointment of Ziyad ibn Abi Sufyan to the government of Iraq and the eastern Caliphate that the Arabs undertook a systematic pacification campaign in Khurasan. From 667 until his death in 670, Ziyad's deputy in Khurasan, al-Hakam ibn Amr al-Ghifari, led a series of campaigns in Tokharistan, which saw Arab armies crossing the Oxus into Saghaniyan in the process. Peroz was evicted and once again fled to China. Al-Hakam's death was followed by another large-scale uprising, but his successor, Rabi ibn Ziyad al-Harithi, took Balkh and defeated the rebels at Quhistan, before crossing the Oxus to invade Saghaniyan. Other Arab forces secured the crossing-points of Zamm and Amul further west, while the Arab sources mention a conquest of Khwarazm at the same time. More importantly for the future of Muslim presence in the region, in 671 Ziyad ibn Abi Sufyan settled 50,000 warriors, mostly drawn from Basra and to a lesser degree from Kufa, with their families in Marw. This move not only bolstered the Muslim element in Khurasan, but also provided the forces necessary for future expansion into Transoxiana.

When Ziyad died, his policies were continued by his son, Ubayd Allah, who was appointed governor of Khurasan and arrived at Marw in autumn 673. In the next spring, Ubayd Allah crossed the Oxus and invaded the principality of Bukhara, which at the time was led by the queen-mother, known simply as Khatun (a Turkic title meaning "lady"), as regent for her infant son. The Arabs achieved a first success near the town of Baykand, before marching on to Bukhara itself. The local historical tradition records that the Arabs besieged Bukhara, and that the Turks were called for help, although this is missing in the Arab sources, which simply state that the Arabs won a great victory over the Bukharans. Following a practice that was apparently common at the time, Ubayd Allah recruited 2,000 captives, all "skillful archers", as his personal guard. The fate of Bukhara is left unclear, but according to Gibb this arrangement suggests that it acknowledged some form of Arab suzerainty and became a tributary state.

Ubayd Allah's success was not followed up by his successors, Aslam ibn Zur'a and Abd al-Rahman ibn Ziyad, apart from launching summer raids across the Oxus. Only during the brief governorship of Sa'id ibn Uthman in 676 did the Arabs launch a major expedition into Sogdia. According to al-Baladhuri and Narshakhi, Sa'id defeated a local coalition comprising the cities of Kish, Nasaf, Bukhara, and the Turks, compelled the Khatun to re-affirm Bukhara's allegiance to the Caliphate, and then marched onto Samarkand, which he besieged an captured. He then took 50 young nobles as hostages, who were later executed at Medina, and on his return journey captured Tirmidh on the Oxus and received the surrender of the prince of Khuttal.

The first Arab attacks across the Oxus ranged as far as Shash and Khwarazm, and were interrupted by the intertribal warfare that broke out in Khurasan during the Second Fitna (683–692). Subsequent governors, most notably Sa'id ibn Uthman and al-Muhallab ibn Abi Sufra, made attempts to conquer territory across the river, but they failed. The native princes, for their part, tried to exploit the Arabs' rivalries, and with the aid of the Arab renegade Musa ibn Abdallah ibn Khazim, who in 689 seized the fortress of Tirmidh for his own domain, they managed to eject the Arabs from their holdings. Nevertheless, the Transoxianian princes remained riven by their own feuds, and failed to unite in the face of the Arab conquest, a fact which would be suitably exploited by Qutayba after 705.

Umayyad–Türgesh Wars 

The larger part of Transoxiana was finally conquered by the Umayyad leader Qutayba ibn Muslim in the reign of al-Walid I (r. 705–715). The loyalties of Transoxiana's native Iranian and Turkic populations and those of their autonomous local sovereigns remained questionable, as demonstrated in 719, when the Transoxianian sovereigns sent a petition to the Chinese and their Turgesh overlords for military aid against the Caliphate's governors.

Qutayba's campaigns have been mixed up with a diplomatic mission. They sent to China in chronicles written by Arabs. Documents in Chinese give 713 as the year the Arab diplomatic delegation was sent. China was asked for help by Shah's Prince against Qutayba.

The Turgesh responded by launching a series of attacks against the Muslims in Transoxiana, beginning in 720. These incursions were coupled with uprisings against the Caliphate among the local Sogdians. The Umayyad governor of Khurasan, Sa'id ibn Amr al-Harashi, harshly suppressed the unrest and restored the Muslim position almost to what it had been during the time of Qutayba, except for the Ferghana Valley, control over which was lost.

The Chinese and Turks were reported to have come to aid the Sogdians in their war against the Arabs which raised the hopes of Divashtich. After the Arabs seized Penjikent, the rebel leader Divashtich retreated to his fortress on Mount Mugh. Archives in the Sogdian language found at Divashtich's fortress reveal his precarious position and the events leading up to his capture. After Divashtich's capture, the governor of Khurasan, Said al-Harashi, ordered his crucifixion on a na'us (burial mound).

Samarkand, Bukhara and Paikent fell to Qutayba ibn Muslim. In response, the Arabs were almost beaten back by the Turgesh, who were partners with the Sogdians. Sulaiman most likely executed Qutayba, who, after seizing Samarkand and Bukhara, had crushed Sassanian remnants and had Khorezmian scholars slaughtered. Ferghana, Khojand and Chach had fallen to Qutayba.

In 721, Turgesh forces, led by Kül Chor, defeated the Caliphate army commanded by Sa'id ibn Abdu'l-Aziz near Samarkand. Sa'id's successor, Al-Kharashi, massacred Turks and Sogdian refugees in Khujand, causing an influx of refugees towards the Turgesh. In 724, Caliph Hisham sent a new governor to Khurasan, Muslim ibn Sa'id, with orders to crush the "Turks" once and for all, but, confronted by Suluk, Muslim hardly managed to reach Samarkand with a handful of survivors after the so-called "Day of Thirst".

In 724, the Muslims were defeated by the Turks of the Turgesh as the Sogdians and Turks fought against the Umayyads.  The Sogdians were pacified by Nasr ibn Sayyar after Sulu, Khagan of the Turgesh, died.

Islam did not widely spread until the Abbasid rule.

Samarkand was taken by Qutayba after they achieved victory over the army of the Eastern Turks under Kul Tegin Qapaghan Qaghan came to assist against the Arabs after his vassal, the Tashkent King, received plea from the Samarkand Prince Ghurak against the Arab attack by Qutayba bin Muslim.

Qutayba's Muslims obliterated and triumphed over the union of several Ferghana states as fierce fighting took place in Sogdian Samarkand and Khorezm against Qutayba ibn Muslim. An easier time was had in the conquest of Bukhara. Under Ghurak, Sogdian Samarkand was forced to capitulate to the joint Arab-Khwarazmian and Bukharan forces of Qutayba. The obliteration of idols was ordered by Qutayba along with the construction of a Mosque, 30,000 slaves and 2,200,000 dirhams. Dewashtich's uprising was an example of anti Islamification sentiment felt after the conquest of the region by the Arabs.

A string of subsequent appointees of Hisham were defeated by Suluk, who in 728 took Bukhara and later on still inflicted  tactical defeats such as the Battle of the Defile upon the Arabs. The Turgesh state was at its apex, controlling Sogdiana and the Ferghana Valley. By 732, two large Arab expeditions to Samarkand managed, if with heavy losses, to reestablish Caliphal authority in the area; Suluk renounced his ambitions over Samarkand and abandoned Bukhara, withdrawing north.

In 734, an early Abbasid follower, al-Harith ibn Surayj, rose in revolt against Umayyad rule and took  Balkh and Marv before defecting to the Turgesh three years later, defeated. In winter 737, Suluk along with his allies al-Harith, Gurak (a Turco-Sogdian leader) and men from Usrushana, Tashkent and Khuttal launched a final offensive. He entered Jowzjan but was defeated by the Umayyad governor Asad at the Battle of Kharistan. Next year, Suluk was murdered by his general with Chinese support. Then in 739, the general himself was killed by the Chinese and the Chinese power returned to Transoxiana.

Much of the culture and heritage of the Sogdians was lost due to the war. Geographic names used by Muslims contained reminders of the Sogdians. The role of lingua franca that Sogdian originally played was succeeded by Persian after the arrival of Islam.

Umayyad-Tang China wars 

Arab sources claim Qutayba ibn Muslim briefly took Kashgar from China and withdrew after an agreement but modern historians entirely dismiss this claim.

The Arab Umayyad Caliphate in 715 AD deposed Ikhshid, the king the Fergana Valley, and installed a new king Alutar on the throne. The deposed king fled to Kucha (seat of Anxi Protectorate), and sought Chinese intervention. The Chinese sent 10,000 troops under Zhang Xiaosong to Ferghana. He defeated Alutar and the Arab occupation force at Namangan and reinstalled Ikhshid on the throne.

General Tang Jiahui led the Chinese to defeat the following Arab-Tibetan attack in the Battle of Aksu (717). The attack on Aksu was joined by Turgesh Khan Suluk. Both Uch Turfan and Aksu were attacked by the Turgesh, Arab, and Tibetan force on 15 August 717. Qarluqs serving under Chinese command, under Arsila Xian, a Western Turkic Qaghan serving under the Chinese Assistant Grand Protector General Tang Jiahui defeated the attack. Al-Yashkuri (the Arab commander) and his army fled to Tashkent after they were defeated.

Last battles 

Samarra, Baghdad, Nishapur and Merv were destinations for Sogdians who worked for the Abbasids and became Muslims. The coming to power of the Abbasids resulted in the local Sogdian rulers being relocated from the area to become the Caliph's officers.

The last major victory of Arabs in Central Asia occurred at the Battle of Talas (751). The Tibetan Empire was allied to the Arabs during the battle against the Chinese Tang dynasty. Because the Arabs did not proceed to Xinjiang at all, the battle was of no importance strategically, and it was An Lushan's rebellion which ended up by forcing the Tang out of Central Asia. Despite the conversion of some Karluk Turks after the Battle of Talas, the majority of Karluks did not convert to Islam until the mid-10th century, when they established the Kara-Khanid Khanate.

Turks had to wait two and a half centuries before reconquering Transoxiana, when the Karakhanids reconquered the city of Bukhara in 999.  Denis Sinor said that it was interference in the internal affairs of the Western Turkic Khaganate which ended Chinese supremacy in Central Asia, since the destruction of the Western Khaganate rid the Muslims of their greatest opponent, and it was not the Battle of Talas which ended the Chinese presence.

Islamization 

The process of islamization of local peoples was slow during the Umayyad Caliphate period, but it became more intensive during the following Abbasid period. The Umayyads treated the local non-Muslims as second class citizens and did not encourage conversions, therefore only few Soghdian commoners converted to Islam during their rule. However, during the Abbasid period non-Arabs gained an equal status with conversion and as a result, Islam began spreading across Central Asia.

References

Citations

Sources 

 
 
  (Account required)

Further reading